Patch Theatre Company, formerly New Patch Theatre, is an Australian theatre company founded in 1972 and based in Adelaide, South Australia, which performs works for young children.

Patch has performed at international children's festivals in Korea, Japan, Singapore, United States, New Zealand and Canada, and has been featured regularly at the Sydney Opera House and Victorian Arts Centre. In 2008, 2010 and 2015, the company’s work was presented in New York City at the prestigious New Victory Theater.

It is funded by the federal government through the Australia Council for the Arts, state government and a number of corporate and private sponsors. The company has maintained a relationship with the Adelaide Festival Centre and produced works as part of the Adelaide Festival of Arts, as well as touring widely.

History 
Patch Theatre Company was founded in 1972 by Morna Jones, a performer and television producer who had worked extensively with children during her career. Morna established Little Patch Theatre in an old farmhouse in High Street, Brighton and its theatrical mainstay was puppetry. Over the years, the company's name changed from New Patch Theatre to Patch Theatre Company.

Following the appointment of Christine Anketell in 1986, Patch's repertoire diversified and its audience base was extended. For the first time the company toured extensively throughout South Australia and Victoria. The company also undertook its first international tour performing in Japan as part of the Okinawa Festival. During her seven years as Artistic Director, Christine developed a relationship with the Adelaide Festival Centre Trust, which saw the realisation of large-scale adaptations of children's literature as well as developing its extensive non-metropolitan tours to schools and community centres. Highlights included Wilfred Gordon McDonald Partridge which had seasons at Expo 88 in Brisbane and the Malthouse in Melbourne, The Secret Garden which headlined the Canberra Festival and Gillian Rubinstein's Space Demons.

Dave Brown joined the company in 1992 and continued to foster the Adelaide Festival Centre relationship, with a co-production of Victor Kelleher's The Red King in 1993.

In 1994, Patch moved from its base in the Community Centre in Tarlton Street, Somerton Park, to become a part of the Pasadena High School campus. Further co-productions with the Adelaide Festival Centre Trust continued, with Gillian Rubinstein's Galax Arena and Each Beach in 1995 and 1997 respectively and the Triple J collaboration, Respectable Shoes in 1996.

Brown's work reflected his interest in exploring new conventions for the use of music in theatre with Respectable Shoes and the Beatlesque pop-opera Kookookachoo. He also explored the sharing of culture through theatre with the Indigenous Australian works Rak Awin and Tjijiku Inma, followed by the Vietnamese Australian work, The Boy and the Bamboo Flute, which was performed by the company until 2006.

From 1998 to 2000, Patch returned to the puppetry roots of its early years led by new Artistic Director Ken Evans. The Adelaide Festival Centre Trust and Come Out '99 presented Ken Evans' and Jonathan Taylor's Visible Darkness, a "collision of film noir, contemporary dance, puppetry and illusion".

In 2000, Brown returned to the Company and set about developing a repertoire of in-theatre productions exclusively for 4-8 year olds and their families. He adapted eight stories by celebrated children's author, Pamela Allen, producing Who Sank the Boat?, a magical work that set the scene for the emergence of Patch Theatre as one of Australia's most respected children's theatre companies. Collaborating with leading artists, Dave Brown created award winning-works including Emily Loves To Bounce, Me and My Shadow, and The Moon's A Balloon.

In 2015 Brown stepped down as Artistic Director, with Naomi Edwards taking over the role.
 
The Company presented six consecutive national Playing Australia tours in the six years up to 2016, and was awarded National Touring Status by the Australia Council. In May 2016, Patch Theatre Company worked with Federation University Australia to bring the “impossibility” of balloons to stage.

In March 2018, Patch presented Can You Hear Colour, an introduction to music and opera for youngsters.

Funding

In 1977 Patch became a general grant company of the Australia Council for the Arts. Later, the company received regular assistance from the State Government through the Youth Performing Arts Council, which was the body responsible for oversight of Carclew Youth Arts Centre.

, the Company is funded by the state  and Commonwealth Governments through the Australia Council, its arts funding and advisory body, as well as the James and Diana Ramsay Foundation as well as corporate and private sponsors. Arts SA and Carclew were responsible for the state funding arrangements, until the Company was transferred to the Department of Education in 2018 by the Marshall government. In July 2019, the state budget slashed funding to the History Trust, Carclew and Windmill, as part of "operational efficiency" cuts.

Key people
Geoff Cobham, former resident lighting designer of the State Theatre Company of South Australia (STCSA), took on the role of artistic director of Patch in October 2018. Prior to STCSA, he had served as associate director at Force Majeure dance company for 10 years, and has also managed various aspects of festivals such as the Adelaide Festival, Sydney Festival and WOMADelaide.

Selected performances
Zoom, Space Theatre, July–August 2019
The Lighthouse, late 2019

References

External links

1972 establishments in Australia
Theatre companies in Australia
Performing arts in Adelaide